The 1996 Kerry Senior Football Championship was the 96th staging of the Kerry Senior Football Championship since its establishment by the Kerry County Board in 1889. The draw for the opening round fixtures took place on 26 February 1996. The championship ran from 14 June to 20 October 1996.

Laune Rangers entered the championship as the defending champions.

The final was played on 20 October 1996 at Austin Stack Park in Tralee, between Laune Rangers and West Kerry, in what was their first ever meeting in the final. Laune Rangers won the match by 2-07 to 1-09 to claim their 10th championship title overall and a second title in succession.

West Kerry's Seán Geaney was the championship's top scorer with 3-17.

Results

Round 1

Round 2

Quarter-finals

Semi-finals

Final

Championship statistics

Top scorers

Overall

In a single game

References

Kerry Senior Football Championship
1996 in Gaelic football